Plavecký Mikuláš is a village and municipality in western Slovakia in Malacky District in the Bratislava region.

References

External links

 Official page
 

Villages and municipalities in Malacky District